Macintyre Art Advisory are a London-based art consultancy who participated in organising the Orientalist and Impressionist 
Exhibition 2007 at the Four Seasons Hotel in Doha. The exhibition was the first of its kind for the region, and featured works by Rudolf Ernst, John Singer Sargent, Edwin Lord Weeks, James Tissot and Pablo Picasso.

References

Arts organisations based in the United Kingdom